Primasheet is a rubberized sheet explosive identical to Detasheet. Manufactured by  Ensign-Bickford Aerospace & Defense Company Primasheet comes in two varieties: Primasheet 1000 is PETN based and Primasheet 2000 is RDX based. Both are waterproof and are supplied in continuous rolls.

Primasheet 1000 
Primasheet 1000 is PETN based, and contains 65% PETN, 8% nitrocellulose, and 27% plasticizer. Primasheet 1000 is olive green colored, and manufactured in 1.0, 1.5, 2, 3, 4, 5, 6, and 8 mm thicknesses.

Primasheet 2000 
Primasheet 2000 is an RDX-based rubberized sheet explosive.  It contains 88.2% RDX with the remainder plasticizer. It is equally as powerful as C4.

SX2 
A British military explosive, also manufactured by Ensign-Bickford.  This is very similar or identical to commercial Primasheet 2000.

References 

Explosives
Rubberized explosives